Jessi M'Bengue (born 27 December 1989) is a French-born model, actress, and singer best known for playing Malika in A Meeting of the Minds and appearing in Robin Thicke's "Blurred Lines" video.

M'Bengue was born in France. Her father is Ivorian-Senegalese and Christian, and her mother is Algerian and Muslim. She lives in London and Los Angeles.

References

External links
 
 

1989 births
Living people
21st-century French actresses
French people of Ivorian descent
French people of Senegalese descent
French people of Algerian descent